Cephalospargeta is a genus of moths of the family Noctuidae. It contains only one species, Cephalospargeta elongata which is found in Texas and on Puerto Rico and Jamaica.

References

External links
 Cephalospargeta at Markku Savela's Lepidoptera and Some Other Life Forms
 Natural History Museum Lepidoptera genus database

Hadeninae
Monotypic moth genera
Moths of North America
Noctuoidea genera
Taxa named by Heinrich Benno Möschler